Erik Bethel is a global finance professional with experience in the private and public sectors. In 2020 he was nominated to serve as the U.S. ambassador to the Republic of Panama. Previously, he was nominated by the president and confirmed unanimously by the Senate to represent the United States at the World Bank.

Early life and education 

Bethel grew up in Miami. His father was Paul Bethel, a career State Department official who was stationed in Cuba, Japan and Germany. His mother is Diana Esperanza Gonzalez Estradé de Bethel. She was born in Havana, Cuba. Bethel graduated with distinction from the United States Naval Academy, where he was an Olmsted Scholar, a Cox Fund Scholar, and a Battalion Commander.  He later earned an Master of Business Administration from Wharton School of the University of Pennsylvania, where he was a Milken Scholar.

Career 

Bethel was nominated to serve as U.S. Ambassador to Panama in 2020. According to the White House Nomination announcement, Bethel is a "financial professional with more than 25 years of private equity and investment banking experience in Latin America and Asia." Mr. Bethel is also a recognized expert on digital assets, and in particular on central bank digital currencies (CBDCs). He began his career at Morgan Stanley in New York covering Brazil, Colombia, and Mexico. Subsequently, he moved to Mexico City as an investment banker and then back to New York where he joined J.P. Morgan's private equity division. In 2006, Bethel relocated to Shanghai, China where he co-founded a financial firm called Sino-Latin Capital which was subsequently acquired by a division of Franklin Templeton.  He has served on the Board of Governors of Opportunity International, a non-profit organization that provides financial services to people living in poverty in developing countries. Bethel is currently on the International Advisory Council of Oxford Analytica, an advisor to Global SWF, a sovereign wealth fund analytics platform, a Senior Fellow at the Center for Strategic and International Studies, a Distinguished Fellow at the Chamber of Digital Commerce, and a Committee Member at the US EXIM Bank."

World Bank service 

On November 21, 2017, President Trump announced his intent to nominate Bethel to a two-year term to represent the United States at the World Bank.  On December 1, 2017, his nomination was sent to the Senate. On March 22, 2018, his nomination was confirmed 100-0 by voice vote. At the World Bank, Bethel promoted a number of initiatives including spearheading the use of new technologies such as artificial intelligence and blockchain to help streamline World Bank operations.

Ambassadorship nomination 

On April 20, 2020, President Trump announced his intent to nominate Bethel as the next United States Ambassador to Panama. On May 4, 2020, his nomination was sent to the Senate. Given the change in the Presidential election outcome, on January 3, 2021, his nomination was returned to the President under Rule XXXI, Paragraph 6 of the United States Senate.

Personal life 

Bethel is Married to Michelle Bethel (née Harp) and has three children. He speaks English, Spanish, Portuguese, and Mandarin.

References

Living people
Year of birth missing (living people)
Place of birth missing (living people)
American financial analysts
American investment bankers
United States Naval Academy alumni
Wharton School of the University of Pennsylvania alumni
World Bank people